European City of the Trees is the title and award given by the European Arboricultural Council. The award is given annually to a town or city by the council in recognition of its care for trees in its urban area.

European Cities of the Trees
 2019 Moscow, Russia
 2018 Apeldoorn, The Netherlands
 2017 Trnava, Slovakia
 2016 Winterthur, Switzerland
 2015 Tallinn, Estonia
 2014 Frankfurt, Germany
 2013 Kraków, Poland
 2012 Amsterdam, Netherlands
 2011 Turku, Finland
 2010 Prague, Czech Republic
 2009 Malmö, Sweden
 2008 Turin, Italy
 2007 Valencia, Spain

See also
European Tree of the Year

References

Urban forestry
Lists of cities in Europe
Cities